Île de la Visitation is a small island in the Rivière des Prairies, part of the Hochelaga Archipelago, and part of the city of Montreal in Quebec, Canada.

Located within the boroughs of Ahuntsic-Cartierville and Montréal-Nord, the island is the site of the L'Île-de-la-Visitation Nature Park, as well as the remaining buildings of the historic Sault-au-Récollet district.

The island also includes the former hydraulic installations, l'île du Cheval-de-Terre, which is connected to Laval by the Rivière des Prairies generating station, as well as a wooded area left intact along the Rivière des Prairies.

History
Known as Branchereau Island until 1750, Île de la Visitation borrows its name from the parish of the Visitation of the Blessed Virgin-Mary which was founded in 1736. In order to control the force of the current, the Sulpician landlords connected the island to the shore by a causeway. Between 1724 and 1726, Simon Sicar, engineer, built the dam and a sawmill near the island. He built a stone mill to grind corn, another for carding wool.

In 1785, the island was surveyed and subdivided.

Mills
Over time, the mills have had several owners.
1726-1837: Séminaire de Montréal
1837-1867: Pascal Persillier-Lachapelle & Succession
1867-1872: Basile Piché
1872-1878: M. Ouimet
1878-1883: Wail McGauvran & Tucken
1883-1890: R. Gagnon père et fils
1890-1906: Dominion Leather Board Company
1906-1950: Back River Power Co
1950-1980: Milmont Fibreboards Co

There have been a few kinds of mills over the years.

1833-1879: Nail mill
1873-1890: Sawmill and paper mill
1890-1977: Paper mill

Maison du Pressoir
The Maison du Pressoir was built in 1806 by Didier Joubert who used it to press apples into cider. It then became a house.

The remains of the stone foundation which served as base for the machine still exist.

References

External links
montreal.com article

See also
 List of islands of Quebec

Visitation
Landforms of Montreal
Ahuntsic-Cartierville
Montréal-Nord
River islands of Quebec